Don Sparrow is a Canadian illustrator, writer, and artist.

Publications in which he has been published include Computer Arts magazine , NUVO magazine , Ohio magazine  and several others.  In 2014 his work was seen on the NBC newsmagazine, Dateline NBC.

He trained at Canada's prestigious Sheridan College under the tutelage of such renowned illustrators as Joe Morse , Gary Taxali , Christoph Niemann and Kathryn Adams .

His artwork has been shown in exhibitions in Hamilton, Ontario, Oakville, Ontario, and Saskatoon's Mendel Art Gallery .

Senator Herbert O. Sparrow is his great-uncle.

He has also done work on album design for independent musicians such as The Fjords  and Boycott Scott .

References

External links
 
 Don Sparrow's MySpace entry
 Don Sparrow on Facebook
 Don Sparrow on Twitter

Year of birth missing (living people)
Living people
Canadian cartoonists
Canadian comics artists
Canadian comics writers
Sheridan College alumni